The Order of the Infanta was a chivalric order of Spain, with only one class and awarded solely to soldiers, with a gold medal for officers and a silver one for other ranks, both on a blue ribbon attached to the lapel. It was set up on 19 June 1833 by Ferdinand VII to mark the oath of loyalty he made that day to his daughter Isabella as heir to the throne. It was renamed the Order of Isabella II on her accession to the throne in 1833.

Orders, decorations, and medals of Spain
Military awards and decorations of Spain
Isabella II of Spain